Ghana Ali Raza is a Pakistani television, film and theater actress. She is known for her work in Pakistani dramas.  Ali earned commercial success with a lead role in the Geo TV drama serial Sangdil. She made her film debut with the musical-drama Rangreza, which was released in 2017.

Acting career
On the experience of acting in her first drama serial, Ali described it as "tough" and considers 2015 as one of the challenging years of her career so far. An article early this year in The News International noted that based on her series of hit drama serials, she is "definitely one of the actress to watch out for". She is known for playing intense roles.She is a firm supporter of LGBT in Pakistan and openly spoken about it.Her upcoming movie Meri Jhaant Pahle Aap is based on LGBT theme.In 2012 she posted her photographs along with Saba Faisal in support of Free the Nipple campaign started by filmmaker Lina Esco.

Filmography

References

External links
 

Living people
Pakistani female models
21st-century Pakistani actresses
Pakistani film actresses
Punjabi people
1994 births